Lyle Elden Gramley (January 14, 1927 – March 22, 2015) was an American economist who served as a member of the Federal Reserve Board of Governors from 1980 to 1985. He previously served as a member of the Council of Economic Advisers from 1977 to 1980.

Born in Aurora, Illinois, Gramley graduated from Beloit College in 1951. He was a member of the CEA during Carter administration until nominated to sit on the Fed Board as governor. After leaving the Fed, Gramley was a financial consultant for several corporations. He then earned his Ph.D. from Indiana University.

References 

1927 births
2015 deaths
Beloit College alumni
Economists from Illinois
Federal Reserve System governors
Indiana University alumni
People from Aurora, Illinois
United States Council of Economic Advisers
Carter administration personnel
Reagan administration personnel
Federal Reserve economists